Juan Quiroga may refer to:

 Juan Facundo Quiroga (1788–1835), Argentine caudillo
 Juan Quiroga (footballer, born 1973), former Chilean footballer
 Juan Quiroga (footballer, born 1982), Argentine footballer